The South Australian Minerals and Petroleum Expert Group (SAMPEG) was first created by the Government of South Australia in 2004. Appointments were made by Premier Mike Rann under Theme 8 of the PACE (Program for Accelerated Exploration) initiative, with the aim of addressing historical perceptions of South Australia's poor mineral and petroleum prospectivity. Appointed members include high-profile national and international leaders in the resource sector. SAMPEG promotes the message that South Australia’s resources potential is under-explored and that the State Government "is willing to back investors in the resources sector, in a strategic, tangible and substantial way, including subsidised drilling and new, free, pre-competitive data."

SAMPEG members also address public perception of the sector by informing the public of improving performance in environmental management, good governance and engagement with local and indigenous communities. This group replaced the original PACE proposal to appoint a single Ambassador. The group currently includes 16 members.

Membership 
As of 2014, SAMPEG membership includes the following persons:
 Ross Adler AC
 Terry Burgess
 Pauline Carr
 Derek Carter
 Owen Hegarty
 Dr Ian Gould AM (chair)
 Geoff Knight
 Robert J Champion de Crespigny AC
 Hugh M Morgan AC
 Leon A Davis AO
 Paul Dowd
 John Roberts
 Erica Smyth
 Kerry Stokes AC
 Trevor Sykes
 Keith R Yates
The original Chair of SAMPEG was Robert J Champion de Crespigny AC. This position was passed to Ian Gould following de Crespigny's relocation to the United Kingdom in 2006.

Objectives 
SAMPEG's objectives include:
 to attract new explorers to South Australia
 to identify companies to be strategically targeted for meetings
 to undertake promotional activities and plan events to further attract investment
 to advise the Minister for Mineral Resources Development
 to achieve third party endorsement of the credentials of the PACE initiative and South Australia’s mineral prospectivity; and
 to support explorers in South Australia by publicizing their successes to the wider investment community

Achievements 2004-2009 
As of 2009, SAMPEG's achievements include hosting a variety of dinners and cocktail events, including some in association with Minister Paul Holloway. The PACE program received the inaugural Premier’s Award for Growing Prosperity in 2008. SAMPEG and/or PACE programs featured in a variety of publications including AusIMM Bulletin, Independent Weekly, Australia’s Paydirt, The Australian Mining Club Journal, Gold and Minerals Gazette, Australia’s Mining Monthly Magazine, SACOME’s regular publication and the SA Mining and Petroleum Bulletin during this period. PACE has a regular feature in each volume of the Department of State Development's (previously DMITRE) MESA Journal, which is published on a quarterly basis through the Minerals and Energy Resources Division.

The Chair of SAMPEG, Dr Ian Gould, was appointed to the Economic Development Board and to Chancellor of the University of South Australia in 2008. SAMPEG Chair and various members held regular briefings as required with Premier Mike Rann and Minister Paul Holloway. SAMPEG claims to have been largely responsible for the record increase in exploration expenditure in South Australia during this period by its promotion of the state's prospectivity. The group has also been responsible for facilitating a number of joint venture deals and new entrants to South Australia following promotional activities.

External links 
 South Australian Minerals and Petroleum Expert Group (SAMPEG)

References 

Government of South Australia
Mining in South Australia
Energy in South Australia
Petroleum industry in Australia